The Fragas do Eume is a natural park situated in north-west Spain. Fraga is a Galician word for "natural woodland", (old-growth forest) and the park is an example of a temperate rainforest in which oak (Quercus robur and Quercus pyrenaica) is the climax vegetation. The protected area extends along the valley of the river Eume within the Ferrolterra municipalities of Pontedeume, Cabanas, A Capela, Monfero, Pontedeume, and As Pontes de García Rodríguez. Some 500 people reside within the park. The monastery of Saint John of Caaveiro also lies within the park.

The area was declared a natural park (a level of protection lower than national park) in 1997. It is one of six natural parks in Galicia. The European Union has recognised the park as a Site of Community Importance. There are a number of species of ferns.  Invertebrate species include the Kerry slug and it is an important site for amphibians.

Flora and Fauna 
Fragas do Eume is a mixed forest considered to be one of the most extensive forests on the Galician coast. The slopes of the river gorge are covered by oaks along with a variety of vegetation and riverside forests. The local humidity favors the growth of an abundant variety of ferns species.

The park is home to 103 species of birds, 41 species of mammals and eight species of fish. The endemic species of invertebrates and reptiles include the Iberian frog.

Environmental Disaster
On March 31, 2012 a fire destroyed the heart of the park. At the beginning of the disaster was estimated within the 1000 hectares burned. The work of extinguishing the fire took 3 days. On Tuesday April, 3rd, the fire was controlled.

Gallery

Notes

External links

 Official Web-site for the Ferrolterra region of Eume  

Natural parks of Spain
Province of A Coruña
Protected areas established in 1997
Forests of Spain
Protected areas of Galicia (Spain)